Neve and Gliz were the official mascots of the 2006 Winter Olympics and Aster was the official mascot of the 2006 Winter Paralympics, both held in Turin, Italy.

Neve and Gliz were created by Pedro Albuquerque. They both represent the characteristics of the Winter Games, including "Snow and Ice". Neve ("Snow" in Italian) is a humanized female snowball that wears red and represents "softness, friendship and elegance." Gliz (a shortened form of Ghiaccio, "Ice" in Italian) is a humanized male ice cube who wears blue and represents "enthusiasm and joy."

For the election of the official mascots of the 2006 Winter Olympics, the Organizing Committee of the Winter Games (TOROC) conducted a contest to which 237 proposals were submitted before closure of the nominations on May 20, 2003. Of these candidates, five came to the final round in which they were evaluated by an international jury selected by TOROC. The election was subsequently ratified by the Presidential Committee of TOROC. Finally, the winners, Albuquerque's "Neve and Gliz," were submitted on September 28, 2004, exactly 500 days before the opening of the Olympics.

For the Paralympic Games, TOROC subsequently requested Albuquerque for the creation of a new mascot along the creative lines of Neve and Gliz. He created Aster, a stylized snow flake that is to convey the Paralympic ideals: the determination, passion and courage of the disabled athlete.
When shown in sport uniforms, Aster is usually represented by the color green. It also completes the colors shown in the 2006 Winter Paralympic Games logo.

External links

Official site for the 2006 Winter Olympics mascot page (Internet Archive)
Official site for the 2006 Winter Paralympics mascot page (Internet Archive)
Presentation of the 2006 Winter Olympics Mascots (PDF archive)

Olympic mascots
Paralympic mascots
Fictional humanoids
Fictional characters with ice or cold abilities
Fictional Italian people
Italian culture